In enzymology, a fucose-1-phosphate guanylyltransferase is an enzyme that catalyzes the chemical reaction

GTP + beta-L-fucose 1-phosphate  diphosphate + GDP-L-fucose

Thus, the two substrates of this enzyme are GTP and beta-L-fucose 1-phosphate, whereas its two products are diphosphate and GDP-L-fucose.

This enzyme belongs to the family of transferases, specifically those transferring phosphorus-containing nucleotide groups (nucleotidyltransferases).  The systematic name of this enzyme class is GTP:beta-L-fucose-1-phosphate guanylyltransferase. Other names in common use include GDP fucose pyrophosphorylase, guanosine diphosphate L-fucose pyrophosphorylase, GDP-L-fucose pyrophosphorylase, GDP-fucose pyrophosphorylase, and GTP:L-fucose-1-phosphate guanylyltransferase.  This enzyme participates in fructose and mannose metabolism.

References

 

EC 2.7.7
Enzymes of unknown structure